Đông Khê may refer to several places in Vietnam:

, a ward of Ngô Quyền District
Đông Khê, Cao Bằng, a township and capital of Thạch An District
Battle of Đông Khê, 1950
, a rural commune of Đông Sơn District